Emanuel Olivera (born 2 April 1990) is an Argentine professional footballer who plays as a defender for Categoría Primera A side Atlético Nacional.

References 

1990 births
Living people
Footballers from Buenos Aires
Argentine footballers
Association football defenders
Argentine Primera División players
Primera Nacional players
Categoría Primera A players
Club Atlético Vélez Sarsfield footballers
Club Almirante Brown footballers
Boca Unidos footballers
Club Atlético Colón footballers
Atlético Nacional footballers
Argentine expatriate footballers
Expatriate footballers in Colombia